As of October 2021, there have been 54 referendums on the question of changing executive arrangements to a model with a directly elected mayor. Of these, 17 have resulted in the establishment of a new mayoralty and 37 have been rejected by voters. Referendums are triggered by council resolution, local petition or central government intervention.

Change to elected mayor?

"Yes" majority shown in green, "No" majority shown in red.

Referendums on removal of mayor
There have been eight referendums on the question of removing the post of elected mayor. Three mayoral posts have been disestablished following a vote and five retained.

"Retain" majority shown in green, "Remove" majority shown in red.

See also
2012 English mayoral referendums

References

Directly elected mayors in England and Wales
Referendums in England
Referendums in Wales